The Eben S. and Elizabeth S. Chase House, located at 203 E. Bullion St. in Hailey, Idaho, is a historic house that was built in 1885.  It was first the home of Italian immigrant Peter Snider, who owned the Challenger Mine.  It was also the home of U. S. Marshal E. S. Chase, who, with John Hailey, A. H. Boomer, and W.T. Riley, had the townsite of Hailey surveyed and platted in 1881.  The house is listed on the National Register of Historic Places.

The owners of the house at time of NRHP listing had bought the home 40 years earlier with little idea of its history.

Also known as the Peter and Maria Snider House and as Temp. Site No. 30, it includes gable front vernacular architecture.  The NRHP listing included two contributing buildings.

References

External links
 Walking tour, including photo of the house on page 3

Houses on the National Register of Historic Places in Idaho
Houses completed in 1885
Houses in Blaine County, Idaho
National Register of Historic Places in Blaine County, Idaho